Bottoms Up is a 1934 American pre-Code musical comedy film made by Fox Film Corporation, and was directed by David Butler who co-wrote original story and screenplay with producer Buddy G. DeSylva and co-star Sid Silvers. The picture stars Spencer Tracy, Pat Paterson, John Boles and Herbert Mundin, and features Thelma Todd in a supporting role.

Plot
The film tells the story of a promoter who helps a Hollywood extra actress toward stardom; however, she turns from him toward her leading man.

At a film premiere of Judith Marlowe's new film, Smoothie meets Wanda, an aspiring actress, Hal, a singing newspaper agent, and Limey, an impoverished Englishman and forger.  Mingling outside, Wanda tells them that she's been dropped by her studio and is very discouraged.  Smoothie brings her, Hal, & Spud, home, telling her that he'll promote her and assures Hal & Spud that he'll help them to make money, too.  He hears her sing and believes that that'll be her ticket into movies.  He tells Limey to set himself up as "Lord Brocklehurst" with Wanda as his daughter (faking a British accent).  This will gain them needed attention from film studios.

Limey, as "Lord Brocklehurst," and Wanda arrive by train, with Smoothie as their P.A., and Hal as a "Reggie Morris," a singer; they're met by reporters.  They check into a hotel, charging everything.  The actress from the premier visits and invites them to a large Hollywood party, where they flirt and mingle, making contacts and trying to find work.  Limey obtains autographs from different actors.  Wanda and Reggie sing and conduct for the company, attracting positive attention.  Hal Reed, a famous actor, leaves drunk, saying that he wants to do something better.  Wanda chases outside & offers to drive him home.  Mr. Wolf, his studio CEO, is horrified by his drunken behavior.

At Hal's home, he asks Wanda to make him a nightcap; he drinks it while she says, "Bottom's Up."  They talk while he falls asleep, and she leaves, Wanda confessing how much his roles have meant to her and that he's very loved, both by the public and by her.

The next morning, Smoothie's confused that no-one's called to inquire about hiring any of them.  Limey says he has a premonition that Wolf will call tomorrow.  He mails him a letter, saying that Hal Reed took an important man's daughter - a minor - to his apartment the night of the party and that the press doesn't yet know.  Wolf panics upon reading the letter, asks Hal who the girl was, and invites the Brocklehurst party to his office. 
 
With Smoothie leading the conversation, Wolf decides to sign Wanda to a contract as "Wanda Gale," relieved that the studio's not being sued.  Upon "Lord Brocklehurst" being insulted, Mr. Wolf signs Reggie to a stunt contract, poo-pooing his singing.  Director Lane Worthing's alarmed at Wolf's hand being forced and says that they - the studio - should investigate in case this is a criminal gang.  Now alarmed too, Wolf and Worthing tell Hal to romance Wanda to obtain information from her.

Judith is removed as the star of her film, replaced by Wanda, and she's furious.  Worthing tells Limey that Wanda's a natural actress.  Reggie's in the film as a knight.  Wanda goes to lunch with Hal, refusing Smoothie's invitation.  Hal takes Wanda on a moonlit sail and tells her he's in love with her.  They kiss, and she asks him if he'd love her if she weren't Lord Brocklehurst's daughter.  He answers that he's in love with Wanda Gale.

Reggie attempts to ride a horse, which runs away from him.  Upon looking up the Brocklehursts in Burke's Peerage, Worthing tells Wolfe he can't find them in the list.  Smoothie tells Wolf that Limey always denied being Lord Brocklehurst and that neither contract could be terminated, as both Wanda and Reggie signed them under their own names.  Wolf denies this only to discover that additional clauses were added to each contract in his handwriting (no doubt forged by Limey, but un-provable).  At this, Smoothie demands more for each actor, including cars to and from the set.  Still in love with Wanda and determined to propose, he buys her an engagement ring.

When Judith finds out, she threatens Wanda and Limey, telling her that the only reason Hal's hung around is because she's "Lord Brocklehurst's daughter."  Wanda declares she's quitting, that she doesn't want a career, but Limey convinces her to stay. She sings and dances with Hal in a musical number for their next film.  After, Hal tells her that he loves Wanda Gale, but says will never believe him again because he was spying on her.  She runs to her dressing room, where Smoothie's waiting to propose.  Smoothie comforts Wanda, who says she never wants to see Hal again.  He promises to take care of everything and pockets his ring.

Smoothie finds Hal, who has started to drink.  Smoothie challenges him about her.  Hal says that it's guys like Smoothie who run out on girls like Wanda when the facade fades, but men like him marry - and he would if Wanda would have him.  Smoothie returns to Wanda to tell her the good news and that he's leaving for San Francisco, asking for a kiss goodbye.  She kisses him, and he leaves.

At the premiere for Wanda and Hal's film, Smoothie, Limey, and Spud are sitting outside.  Limey pulls out his autograph book, saying that he still has signatures and they can do something with them.  Smoothie throws it away, to Limey's horror.  On the red carpet, Wolf brags that he signed Wanda to her contract.  Hal and Wanda publicly thank Smoothie for his great kindness to them.

Cast
Spencer Tracy as 'Smoothie' King 
Pat Paterson as Wanda Gale 
John Boles as Hal Reed 
Sid Silvers as Spud Mosco aka Reginald Morris 
Herbert Mundin as Limey Brook aka Lord Brocklehurst 
Thelma Todd as Judith Marlowe 
Robert Emmett O'Connor as Detective Rooney 
Dell Henderson as Lane Worthing 
Suzanne Kaaren as Wolf's Secretary 
Douglas Wood as Baldwin

Reception
It received a favorable review from The New York Times critic Mordaunt Hall, who called it "a neat, carefree piece of work, which is helped greatly by Spencer Tracy, Pat Paterson, an English actress who here makes her American picture bow; Herbert Mundin, Harry Green, and, to a lesser extent, by John Boles" and noted that it "has its full share of honest humor and also several tuneful songs."

Nonetheless, it was a box office disappointment for Fox.

References

External links

1934 films
1934 musical comedy films
American black-and-white films
American musical comedy films
Films about actors
Fox Film films
Films directed by David Butler
1930s American films